Gulou station (literally Drum Tower station) may refer to one of several metro stations in China:

 Gulou / Drum Tower station, Ningbo
 Gulou station (Nanjing Metro), Nanjing
 Gulou station (Tianjin Metro), Tianjin
 Gulou Dajie station, Beijing
 , Kunming

See also
 Gulou (disambiguation)
 Gulu railway station